The Changing Woman is a 1918 American silent comedy drama film directed by David Smith and starring Hedda Nova, J. Frank Glendon and Otto Lederer.

Plot summary 
An opera diva touring with her company in South America charms everyone she meets except Johnny Armstrong, who has no use for her or any other woman. When she is taken captive by an Indian tribe, Johnny rescues her. On their way back to civilization, Johnny sees a change in her brought about by the experience of being captured and rescued, and he begins to fall for her. However, the closer they get to civilization, the more she begins to revert to the arrogant, attention-craving diva she had been. Johnny comes up with a plan he hopes will "bring back" the woman he has grown to love.

Cast
Hedda Nova as Nina Girard 
J. Frank Glendon as Johnny Armstrong 
Otto Lederer as President Guzman Blanco 
George Kunkel as Company Manager

References

External links

1918 comedy films
American silent feature films
American black-and-white films
Vitagraph Studios films
Films directed by David Smith (director)
1910s English-language films
1910s American films
Silent American comedy films